Under Fire may refer to:

Books
 Under Fire (Barbusse novel) (French: Le Feu), a novel by Henri Barbusse
 Under Fire (Blackwood novel), by Grant Blackwood in Tom Clancy's Jack Ryan Jr. franchise series
 Under Fire (North book), a non-fiction book by Oliver North

Film and TV
 Under Fire (1926 film), an American silent western film
 Under Fire (1957 film), a 1957 film starring Rex Reason
 Under Fire (1983 film), a 1983 film starring Nick Nolte
 "Under Fire" (Casualty), a webisode of the British medical drama Casualty
 "Under Fire" (Dad's Army), an episode of the British sitcom Dad's Army
 Under Fire (TV series), a 2003 documentary TV series, written and presented by Dan Cruickshank

Games
 Under Fire!, a 1985 computer wargame
 Under Fire (video game), a 1993 arcade game

Music
 "Under Fire", a song by Axium from The Story Thus Far
 "Under Fire", a 2018 song by Spice from the mixtape Captured
 Under Fire (album), an album by Gato Barbieri